Gringo Gulch is a valley in Santa Cruz County, Arizona, in the United States.

The valley's name is derived from the ethnonym gringo.

References

Landforms of Santa Cruz County, Arizona
Valleys of Arizona